Still 2gether (Because We (Still) Belong Together) is a 2020 Thai television series starring Vachirawit Chiva-aree and Metawin Opas-iamkajorn, which is sequel to 2gether: The Series.

Directed by Aof Noppharnach and produced by GMMTV, the five-episode special series was announced on 1 June 2020. It premiered on GMM 25 and LINE TV on 14 August 2020.

Synopsis 
As Tine (Metawin Opas-iamkajorn) and Sarawat (Vachirawit Chiva-aree) enter the second year of their relationship full of love and warmth for each other, they also begin to take on bigger responsibilities in the university with the former as the new president of the cheerleading club while the latter as the new president of the music club. With both clubs moving into adjacent rooms, this causes them to compete with each other during practice sessions. The growing quarrel between these clubs, which has already involved their friends, will challenge Tine and Sarawat's relationship.

Cast and characters 
Below are the cast of the series:

Main lead 
 Vachirawit Chiva-aree (Bright) as Sarawat Guntithanon
 A popular college student from the Faculty of Political Science, football player, guitarist, lead member of the band "Ctrl+S", the new president of the music club and Tine's boyfriend.

 Metawin Opas-iamkajorn (Win) as Tine Teepakorn
 A college student from the Faculty of Law, the new secretary of the music club, the new president of his faculty's cheerleading squad and Sarawat's boyfriend.

Supporting

Music Club 
 Sivakorn Lertchuchot (Guy) as Dim
 Former head of the music club and Green's boyfriend. He graduates in this series and asks Sarawat to replace him as the new head of the music club. However, he does continue assisting the club while he is unemployed.

 Rachanun Mahawan (Film) as Earn
 A member of the music club and of the club's band "Ctrl+S".

Cheerleading Squad 
 Korawit Boonsri (Gun) as Green
 A college student from the Faculty of Humanities and Social Sciences, a member of the music club, a new member of the cheerleading club, and Dim's boyfriend.

 Thanatsaran Samthonglai (Frank) as Phukong
 Sarawat's younger brother, Mil's boyfriend and a new member of the cheerleading squad.

 Pattranite Limpatiyakorn (Love) as Pear
 A member of the cheerleading squad and Boss' love interest.

People close to Tine 
 Jirakit Kuariyakul (Toptap) as Type
 Tine's elder brother and Man's boyfriend.

 Thanawat Rattanakitpaisan (Khaotung) as Fong
 One of Tine's best friends who gives him advice.

 Chayakorn Jutamat (JJ) as Ohm
 One of Tine's best friends who gives him advice.

People close to Sarawat 
 Chanagun Arpornsutinan (Gunsmile) as Boss
 One of Sarawat's best friends who has a crush on Pear. Football player of the Faculty of Political Science.

 Chinnarat Siripongchawalit (Mike) as Man
 One of Sarawat's best friends and Type's boyfriend. Football player of the Faculty of Political Science.

Other 
 Sattabut Laedeke (Drake) known as Mil
 A student from the Faculty of Architecture and Phukong's boyfriend. Part of the Faculty of Architecture’s football team and the lead vocalist of a band. He substitutes as the lead guitarist of "Ctrl+S" when there was an emergency in the music club.

Guest role 
 Watchara Sukchum (Jennie) as herself ( 2)
 A legendary electric guitarist who appeared in the music club's event.

 Phakjira Kanrattanasoot (Nanan) as Fang ( 1, 2 and 4)
 Former head of the Faculty of Law's cheerleading squad. Also an adviser for the cheerleading team.

Episodes

Soundtracks 
Its original soundtrack "ยังคู่กัน" (Yang Koo Gun) ranked No. 1 for three consecutive weeks (Week 31, Week 32 and Week 33) in Joox Thailand's Top 100. It also ranked No. 1 in Week 32 of Joox Thailand's Top 20 Social Chart.

Reception 
With the release of its first episode on 14 August 2020, the hashtag "ยังคั่นกูEp1" was the number 1 trending topic on Twitter worldwide and in 12 places namely Thailand, Vietnam, Singapore, Malaysia, Indonesia, Puerto Rico, Brazil, Japan, India, United States, Mexico, and Peru. On the same day, some online users used the hashtag "ยังอิกนอEp1" as they expressed their disappointment on lead actor Vachirawit Chiva-aree for not making a stand amidst the ongoing 2020 Thai protests despite replying to a follower's tweet on 31 March 2020 that he would speak not just on COVID-19 but other issues affecting the youth.

Viewers in the Philippines, who were used to the series' simulcast of 2gether: The Series on GMMTV's YouTube channel, were caught by surprise after the series was not made available to the country because of the deal inked by GMMTV and iWant. This later prompted the latter to release the Thai version on English subtitles at 23:30 PST, an hour after its Filipino-dubbed version is released. The same issue was also experienced by viewers in Japan.

With the airing of its fifth and last episode on 11 September 2020, the hashtag "ยังคั่นกูตอนจบ" became the top trending topic in Thailand and also a trending topic worldwide on Twitter with over 2 million tweets. The series also garnered over 40 million views on YouTube and 27 million views on LINE TV one month after the airing of its first episode.

International broadcast 
Philippines – The series is dubbed in Filipino and premiered on online via iWantTFC on 14 August 2020, airing Fridays at 22:30 PST similar to its Thailand broadcast and 23:30 PST for the original version with English subtitles. It is also aired on pay cable and satellite via Kapamilya Channel on 15 August 2020, every Saturdays at 22:00 PST.
Japan – On 28 September 2020,  announced that it had acquired the distribution rights for three television series from GMMTV, including Still 2gether. It is scheduled to be distributed locally in Japanese subtitles by the end of 2020.

Awards and nominations

Notes

References

External links 
 Still 2gether on GMM 25 website 
 Still 2gether  on LINE TV
 GMMTV

Television series by GMMTV
GMM 25 original programming
Thai romantic comedy television series
2020 Thai television series debuts
2020 Thai television series endings
Thai boys' love television series
2020s LGBT-related comedy television series
2020s LGBT-related drama television series